Lowell Lo Kwun Ting (born 12 October 1950) is a Hong Kong singer-songwriter, actor and film composer. He wrote the film scores to many Hong Kong films. He is now also an environmental activist.

Early life
Lowell Lo Kwun Ting was born on 12 October 1950 in Hong Kong. Both his parents are opera singers. At the age of 16, he and his family moved to Seattle in the United States. There, he was a family friend of Bruce Lee. In 1977, he returned to Hong Kong.

Filmography

Films 
 Find Your Voice (2019)
 Sons of the Neon Night (2019)
 Crossing Hennessy (2010)
 Black Rose II (1997)
 How to Meet the Lucky Stars (1996)
 Spider Woman (1995)
 Magnificent Warriors (1987)

References

External links
 
 HK cinemagic entry

1950 births
Living people
20th-century guitarists
21st-century guitarists
Male guitarists
Acoustic guitarists
20th-century Hong Kong male singers
20th-century Hong Kong male actors
21st-century Hong Kong male singers
Hong Kong guitarists
Hong Kong singer-songwriters
Cantopop singer-songwriters
Male songwriters
Hong Kong film score composers
Hong Kong male film actors
Hong Kong democracy activists
Hong Kong environmentalists
Male film score composers